Fabio Maranta (died 1619) was a Roman Catholic prelate who was Bishop of Calvi Risorta (1582–1619).

On 5 March 1582, Fabio Maranta was appointed Bishop by Pope Gregory XIII as Bishop of Calvi Risorta.
He served as Bishop of Calvi Risorta until his death in 1619.

References

External links and additional sources
 (for Chronology of Bishops) 
 (for Chronology of Bishops) 

16th-century Italian Roman Catholic bishops
1619 deaths
Bishops appointed by Pope Gregory XIII